Sweden competed at the 1952 Winter Olympics in Oslo, Norway.

Medalists

Alpine skiing

Men

Women

Bobsleigh

Cross-country skiing

Men

Men's 4 × 10 km relay

Women

Figure skating

Pairs

Ice hockey

Summary

The tournament was run in a round-robin format with nine teams participating.

Sweden 9–2 Finland
Sweden 17–1 Poland
Norway 2–4 Sweden
Sweden 7–3 Germany FR
Sweden 4–2 USA
Canada 3–2 Sweden
Sweden 5–2 Switzerland
Czechoslovakia 4–0 Sweden
Sweden 5–3 Czechoslovakia 1

1 Sweden and Czechoslovakia were tied with identical record and goal differentials, so a tie breaker game was played.

Nordic combined 

Events:
 18 km cross-country skiing
 normal hill ski jumping

The cross-country skiing part of this event was combined with the main medal event, meaning that athletes competing here were skiing for two disciplines at the same time. Details can be found above in this article, in the cross-country skiing section.

The ski jumping (normal hill) event was held separate from the main medal event of ski jumping, results can be found in the table below (athletes were allowed to perform three jumps, the best two jumps were counted and are shown here).

Ski jumping

Speed skating

Men

References

 Olympic Winter Games 1952, full results by sports-reference.com

Nations at the 1952 Winter Olympics
1952
Olympics